The WLBT Tower was a  guy-wired aerial mast for the transmission of FM radio and TV-programs in Raymond, Mississippi, United States, for the Jackson metro area. The mast was constructed in 1966. On October 23, 1997, the mast, which was property of Cosmos Broadcasting (WLBT a local NBC affiliate), collapsed during the renovation of its guy wires. Three workers were killed. The tower was rebuilt in 1999.

See also 
 List of masts

References

External links 
 
 http://www.skyscraperpage.com/diagrams/?b7120
 
 http://msrmaps.com/GetImageArea.ashx?t=1&s=10&lon=-90.382500&lat=32.213889&w=600&h=400&f=&fs=8&fc=ffffff99&logo=1&lp=

 http://www.current.org/mo/mo722f.html

Towers completed in 1966
Towers in Mississippi
Radio masts and towers
Former radio masts and towers
1966 establishments in Mississippi